The Savage Resurrection was an American psychedelic rock band from the San Francisco Bay area, and were active in between 1967 and 1968. The band were known as one of the youngest psychedelic rock bands in the area, with their 16-year-old lead guitarist, Randy Hammon, who is the cousin of Blue Cheer drummer Paul Whaley. There was only one member of the band who was not a teenager, and that was Steve Lage, who was 21.

History
Founded in 1967, the group was signed to Mercury Records, on which they released their eponymous debut in 1968. Their album was produced by Abe "Voco" Kesh who is famous with his work with the band Blue Cheer and Harvey Mandel. Their sound was close to groups such as Love and the Jimi Hendrix Experience. Singer Bill Harper and bassist Steve Lage quit the band shortly thereafter, leading to the demise of the group. The band continued on touring until late 1968 and then disbanded.

Nick Saloman of The Bevis Frond has cited the Savage Resurrection as one of his biggest influences and, in October 2008, performed a live set with guitarist Randy Hammon.  There was some suspicion that Randy Hammon was actually Randy Holden due to some citing that was done in Joe Carducci's book, The Pop Narcotic; this seems to be a misconception.

Post 1968
Bill Harper went on to write and perform, notably appearing on an LP and several singles with The Stepford Husbands in the early '80s. Jeff Myer recorded and toured extensively throughout the '70s and '80s with Van Morrison, Jesse Colin Young, Janis Ian, Tom Fogerty, Terry and The Pirates (with Terry Dolan, John Cipollina, and Greg Douglass), and reggae band The Edge (with the Rowan brothers). Former band member Steve Lage, who was born Stephen Allen Lage on August 15, 1947, died on July 25, 2010 in Oakland, California.

Present day
A version of The Savage Resurrection has been performing since 2007.  It features original members Bill Harper and Randy Hammon and Jeff Myer but Jeff left about 2019.

The group was joined by John Hansen on bass, Greg Langston on drums, and Cliff Moser on guitar.

Band members
Bill Harper - lead vocals
Randy Hammon - lead guitar
John Palmer - guitar
Steve Lage - bass guitar
Jeff Myer - drums

Discography

Singles 
 "Thing in E" b/w "Fox Is Sick" (Mercury 72778) 1968
 "Thing in E" b/w "Fox Is Sick" [Reissue] (Mercury 72778 1-35789) 1968

Albums 
 The Savage Resurrection (Mercury MG-21156 (mono)/SR-61156 (stereo)) 1968
 The Savage Resurrection [Reissue] (Mercury 134 068 MFY) 1968

References

External links
[ The Savage Resurrection] at Allmusic

Mercury Records artists
Musical groups established in 1967
Musical groups disestablished in 1968
Musical groups from San Francisco
Psychedelic rock music groups from California